Paddi Edwards (December 9, 1931 – October 18, 1999) was a British-American actress. She worked steadily in film and television.

Career
She found a niche in television movies, and toward the end of her life, doing voice work in projects for Disney, such as the roles of Flotsam & Jetsam in The Little Mermaid franchise.

Across a career spanning many live-action and voice-acting performances, she worked on Ghostbusters, 101 Dalmatians,  Hercules, and Pepper Ann.

Death
Edwards died of respiratory failure on October 18, 1999, aged 67, at her home in Encino, California.

Partial filmography

References

External links
 

1931 births
1999 deaths
American film actresses
American television actresses
American voice actresses
English film actresses
English television actresses
English voice actresses
English emigrants to the United States
Deaths from respiratory failure
20th-century American actresses
20th-century English women
20th-century English people